José Antonio Ñíguez Vicente (born 30 September 1962), known as Boria, is a Spanish former professional footballer who played as a striker.

He spent most of his senior career with Elche, with which he appeared in all three major levels of Spanish football for a total of ten seasons.

Club career
Born in Elche, Valencian Community, Boria played mainly for local Elche CF. He made his senior debut at only 18 and competed almost exclusively in Segunda División, scoring a career-best 13 goals in 33 games in the 1983–84 season to help the club return to La Liga after a six-year absence.

Boria featured much less the following campaign, which ended in immediate relegation. He played his first match in the top flight on 1 September 1984 in a 0–1 local derby home loss against Valencia CF, and netted his first and only goal in the competition on 7 October of that year, contributing decisively to a 2–1 win at Real Valladolid.

Boria achieved another promotion to the top level with the Franjiverdes in 1988, but never played in that tier again, seeing out his professional career in late 1990 after spells with CE Sabadell FC and UE Figueres. The following year he re-joined Elche, now in Segunda División B.

Personal life
Boria's three sons, Aarón, Jonathan and Saúl, are also footballers.

References

External links

1962 births
Living people
Footballers from Elche
Spanish footballers
Association football forwards
La Liga players
Segunda División players
Segunda División B players
Elche CF players
CE Sabadell FC footballers
UE Figueres footballers
Cartagena FC players
CD Mensajero players